LZA or variant may refer to:

 ".LZA", a variant of the LHA (file format)
 LZA, a ham radio prefix assigned to Bulgaria, see Amateur radio call signs
 Lanza Air (ICAO airline code: LZA; callsign: AEROLANZA) a Spanish airline, see List of airline codes (L)
 Luiza Airport (IATA airport code: LZA; ICAO airport code: FZUG), Luiza, Kasai-Occidental Province, Democratic Republic of the Congo
 Lža River, a river in Latvia and Pskov Oblast, Russia
 Lake Zoar Authority, an organization for improving safety and water quality on Lake Zoar

See also

 Iaz (disambiguation)
 AZ1 (disambiguation)
 Laz (disambiguation)
 ALZ (disambiguation)
 AZL (disambiguation)
 Zal (disambiguation)
 ZLA, Los Angeles Air Route Traffic Control Center